The UT Arlington Mavericks women's basketball team is an NCAA Division I college basketball team competing in the Western Athletic Conference and representing the University of Texas at Arlington. Home games are played at College Park Center, located on the university's campus in Arlington, Texas. The team appeared in the 2005 NCAA tournament, losing to #4 seed Texas Tech in the first round, 69–49, and the 2007 NCAA tournament, dropping their first round game to #4 seed Texas A&M 58–50.
The team has also made three postseason appearances in the NIT, the first in 1998 as an at-large, the second in 2009 and the most recent was another at-large bid in 2017.

Team history 

The Mavericks began their first year of play in the 1972–73 season in the Association for Intercollegiate Athletics for Women. Legendary coach Jody Conradt joined the Mavericks in their second year and was head coach for three years. When all women’s sports joined the NCAA and began play in the same conferences as the men’s sports, UTA began competing in the Southland Conference in 1982–83. Since that time, they have won three regular season titles and two tournament titles. They have finished as the regular season runner-up four times and been the tournament runner-up twice.

UTA joined the Western Athletic Conference for the 2012–13 season. It was also their final year in the WAC, as UTA joined the Sun Belt Conference July 1, 2013.

Facilities 
Until February 2012, the Mavericks played at Texas Hall, which is a 3,300-seat theater on the campus.  The teams played on the stage, and fans could watch the game from either the theater seats or the bleacher section.

A new arena called the College Park Center with a seating capacity of 7,000 hosted the final four regular-season home games for the team in 2012. The facility is located on the eastern side of the campus along with new housing, parking, and retail developments.
The Mavericks have not had a home court advantage at CPC as UTA sports a 35-42 records. The last three years have been better, as the team is 28-16 (as of the 2016-17 season).

Coaches 
The Mavericks have had 9 coaches, listed below, in their 42-year history. Krista Gerlich is the current coach. Her first full season began in October, 2013.  She is currently in her third season as the Mavericks's head coach.
 Carla Lowry – 1973-1973 (1 seasons)
 Jody Conradt – 1973–1976 (3 seasons)
 Cindy Salser – 1976–1979 (3 seasons)
 Connie Kelch – 1979–1989 (10 seasons)
 Jerry Isler – 1989–1992 (3 seasons)
 Mike Dean – 1992–2000 (8 seasons)
 Donna Capps – 2000–2007 (7 seasons)
 Samantha Morrow – 2007–2013 (5 seasons)
 Krista Gerlich – 2013–2020 (7 seasons)
 Shereka Wright - 2020 - present

Season-by-season results

NCAA tournament results
The Mavericks have appeared in three NCAA Tournaments, with a combined record of 0–3.

References

External links